Pakartanr (also called Pakardanr) is a village in the Pakartanr CD block in the Simdega subdivision of the Simdega district in the Indian state of Jharkhand.

Geography

Location                      
Pakardanr is located at

Area overview 
In the area presented in the map alongside, “the landscape is formed of hills and undulating plateau” in the south-western part of the Chota Nagpur Plateau. About 32% of the district is covered with forests (mark the shaded portions in the map.) It is an overwhelmingly rural area with 92.83% of the population living in the rural areas.  A major portion of the rural population depends on rain-fed agriculture (average annual rainfall: 1,100-1,200 mm) for a living.

Note: The map alongside presents some of the notable locations in the district. All places marked in the map are linked in the larger full screen map.

Civic administration  
There is a police station at Pakartanr. 
 
The headquarters of Pakartanr CD block are located at Pakartanr village.

Demographics 
According to the 2011 Census of India, Pakardanr had a total population of 3,098, of which 1,576 (51%) were males and 1,522 (49%) were females. Population in the age range 0–6 years was 481. The total number of literate persons in Pakardanr was 1,951 (74.55% of the population over 6 years.

(*For language details see Pakartanr block#Language and religion)

Education 
Government High School Pakardanr Ramlova is a Hindi-medium coeducational institution established in 1988. It has facilities for teaching from class I to class X. The school has a playground and a library with 203 books.

References 

Villages in Simdega district